The following are the national records in athletics in Belize maintained by its national athletics federation: Belize Athletic Association (BAA).

Outdoor
Key to tables:

h = hand timing

OT = oversized track (> 200m in circumference)

Men

Women

Indoor

Men

Women

Notes

References
General
World Athletics Statistic Handbook 2019: National Outdoor Records
World Athletics Statistic Handbook 2018: National Indoor Records
Specific

External links

Belize
Records
Athletics